Australia–North Macedonia relations are the bilateral relation between Australia and North Macedonia. Australia is accredited to North Macedonia from its embassy in Belgrade, Serbia and maintains an honorary consulate in Skopje. North Macedonia has an embassy in Canberra and has a consulate-general in Melbourne.

History
Australia recognized the independence of North Macedonia, then known as the former Yugoslav Republic of Macedonia, in 1994 and established relations in 1995. Australia also helped committing for solving the naming conflict between Greece and the Republic of Macedonia at the time, as Australia is also the home of a significant Greek population which always has tensions with the smaller Macedonian diaspora.

Macedonian diaspora in Australia

The population from North Macedonia in Australia is officially acknowledged to be around 100,000 by ancestry, but there is about 200,000 people claim by the community. Historically, while record about Macedonian presence to Australia surfaced in 19th century, the community came to Australia much later than other former Yugoslav diasporas, they only came to Australia by 1920s and 1930s as was known as Yugoslavs back then. The second migration occurred in 1960s. The Macedonian community has largely integrated and does not have problem with the local population.

See also 
 Foreign relations of Australia
 Foreign relations of North Macedonia
 Macedonian Australians
 Australia–Yugoslavia relations

References

 
North Macedonia
Bilateral relations of North Macedonia